Sara Wiseman is a New Zealand actress, best known for her roles in the television series Mercy Peak as Dr. Nicky Somerville, '’A Place to Call Home as Carolyn Bligh and The Cult as Annabelle Willis.

Beginning her career with low-profile TV roles in Hercules: The Legendary Journeys (1996 and 1999), Xena: Warrior Princess (1995) and Jackson's Wharf (2000). Wiseman made her first high-profile television appearance in the drama series Street Legal as Louise Jarvis in 2000, before in 2001 getting the role of Dr. Nicky Sommerville in the New Zealand TV series Mercy Peak. For her role in the show, Wiseman garnered several nominations at the New Zealand Film and Television Awards under the category "Best Actress" during 2002 and 2003 respectively, alongside these accolades in 2005 Wiseman was nominated for the "Television - Best Performance By an Actress" award at the New Zealand Screen Award. Wiseman starred in Mercy Peak until 2002, when she left the cast after the tenth episode of the second series. Following the conclusion of her role in the show, Wiseman went on to star in Atomic Twister, Serial Killers and Matuka. Wiseman also went on to appear in the movie Jinx Sister in 2008, for which she garnered her third New Zealand Film and Television Awards nomination under the category of "Performance by an Actress in a Leading Role". Following this Wiseman went on to have recurring roles in television series such as Outrageous Fortune" (2007 - 2008), "Shortland Street" (2011), "Crownies" (2011) and "The Almighty Johnsons (2011–2012); whilst she also appeared in the short-lived drama series The Cult as Annabelle Willis in 2009. During 2012, Wiseman won her first-ever New Zealand Film and TV Award for her starring role in the TV movie Votes For Women: What Really Happened?. More recently, Wiseman has guest starred on The Doctor Blake Mysteries as Olivia Goldsmith and as Caitlin Farquhar in Rake during 2015 and 2016 respectively. Alongside various television appearances Wiseman has also gone on to perform in The Insatiable Moon (2010), Love Birds (2011), Nerve (2013), Venus and Mars (2015) and Human Traces (2017).

During 2013, Wiseman appeared for the first time as recurring character Carolyn Bligh, in the Australian romantic drama series A Place to Call Home. Following a successful first season, the show was rented for a second season, in which Wiseman's character was upgraded to a main character. Wiseman's storylines whilst on the show have included relevant world issues such as sexual assault, which the show explored during its third season when Wiseman's character was sexually assaulted by someone she had trusted, on the subject Wiseman has stated that the storyline was a "poignant and challenging subject matter to tackle". When the fourth season of A Place to Call Home was due to air in 2016, Wiseman stated that there was "a darker edge" to the upcoming series. The fifth series of the show aired in 2017, and the sixth, and final series, aired in 2018.
She played Tanya Reed in series 3 of Harrow (2021).

 Early life 
Wiseman was born in Auckland, New Zealand. She is the youngest of three children and grew up practising dance and snow skiing. She attended the classic course at Outward Bound NZ three times and is now an ambassador for Outward Bound NZ.

Career and personal life
Wiseman completed a Bachelor of Performing & Screen Arts at UNITEC in Auckland and has worked on both stage and screen. Wiseman has also worked as a presenter and voiceover artist. Wiseman works both in NZ and Australia. Her movie and television roles include leads, supporting and guest appearances. Wiseman has been nominated for film and television awards multiple times and in 2011 she won Best Supporting Actress in a Feature Film at the Aotearoa Film and Television awards for her role in Matariki. That year she was also a finalist for Best Lead Actress in a Feature Film for her role in The Insatiable Moon. She won Best Actress for playing Kate Sheppard in What Really Happened: The Women's Vote at the NZ Television Awards in 2012.
Wiseman co-founded and is a board member and tutor at NZ acting school; The Actors Program.
In 2013 Wiseman joined the cast of Australian Period drama A Place To Call Home in the recurring role of Carolyn Bligh before being promoted to regular cast for the second season. Wiseman later appeared on Bevan Lee's Seven Network series Between Two Worlds with Hermione Norris, Aaron Jeffery and Alex Cubis. Wiseman joined the cast of CBBC drama ''Mystic'' in 2021.

Wiseman is married to actor Craig Hall. She publicly came out bisexual in 2021.

In August 2022, Wiseman was cast in a role in the film Kingdom of the Planet of the Apes'', to be directed by Wes Ball for 20th Century Studios.

Filmography

Film

Television

References

External links

1972 births
Living people
Bisexual actresses
Bisexual women
New Zealand LGBT actors
New Zealand film actresses
New Zealand soap opera actresses
New Zealand television actresses
20th-century New Zealand actresses
21st-century New Zealand actresses